The 1988 Sacramento State Hornets football team represented California State University, Sacramento as a member of the Western Football Conference (WFC) during the 1988 NCAA Division II football season. Led by 11th-year head coach Bob Mattos, Sacramento State compiled an overall record of 10–3 with a mark of 4–2 in conference play, tying for second place in the WFC. The team outscored its opponents 479 to 272 for the season. The Hornets played home games at Hornet Stadium in Sacramento, California.

The Hornets finished the regular season schedule with a record of 8–2. For the first time they qualified for the NCAA Division II Football Championship playoffs. The first game was against traditional rival UC Davis, who they defeated 35–14. The Division II quarterfinal game was against , and the Hornets dominated the game, 56–7. The Division II semifinal game was against undefeated North Central Conference champion North Dakota State. North Dakota State defeated the Hornets, 42–20, on their way to a national title.

Eight players Sacramento State received first-team All-WFC honors: wide receiver Mark Young, running back Donald Hair, center Harry Williams, kicker Jim Gill, defensive lineman Ken Stinnett, linebacker Derek Stigerts, defensive back JR Richards, and safety Gary Lunsford.

Schedule

References

Sacramento State
Sacramento State Hornets football seasons
Sacramento State Hornets football